Huangcaozhuang railway station is a railway station on the Qingzang railway.

See also
List of stations on Qingzang railway

Railway stations in Qinghai
Stations on the Qinghai–Tibet Railway